The  was a  tramway operated by Tobu Railway, which ran from Kokutetsu Ekimae (next to JNR Nikkō Station) to Umagaeshi in Tochigi Prefecture.

References

Nikko Tramway
Rail transport in Tochigi Prefecture
1067 mm gauge railways in Japan
Railway lines opened in 1910
Railway lines closed in 1968
Tōbu Nikkō
1910 establishments in Japan
1968 disestablishments in Japan